Doi Mae Tho, also known as Doi Langka Luang (ดอยลังกาหลวง) or Doi Lang Ka (ดอยลังกา), is a mountain in Thailand, part of the Khun Tan Range.

The mountain rises southwest of Wiang Pa Pao District, Chiang Rai Province, near the point where the province meets with Chiang Mai and Lampang Provinces. With a height of 2,031 metres, it is the highest point of the Khun Tan Range.
 
Its summit is less than eight kilometres southeast of Route 118 between Chiang Mai and Chiang Rai.

See also
Thai highlands
List of mountains in Thailand

References

External links
Khun Chae National Park

Mountains of Thailand
Khun Tan Range
Two-thousanders of Asia